Qum Island or Peschanniy ('Sandy Island'), Azeri: Qum adası) is an island in the Bay of Baku, in the Caspian Sea.

Geography
It is a part of the Surakhany raion, located south of Baku, Azerbaijan.

See also

Petroleum industry in Azerbaijan

References

Islands of Azerbaijan
Islands of the Caspian Sea
Mud volcanoes of Azerbaijan
Uninhabited islands of Azerbaijan